R v McCraw, [1991] 3 S.C.R. 72 was a decision by the Supreme Court of Canada on rape threats. The Court found that such threats should be considered threats of bodily harm under the Criminal Code.

Background
The case involved one Stephen Joseph McCraw, who was interested in the cheerleaders of the football team Ottawa Rough Riders. One day, he phoned some of the cheerleaders and mailed them letters.  The letters stated that he wanted to have sex with them and if necessary would rape them to do it. One letter quoted by the Supreme Court read,

McCraw was arrested and the cheerleaders said in court that they had been terrified by the letters. Nevertheless, the judge found that while the letters did threaten rape, they may not have threatened bodily harm.  Instead, the judge called the content of the letters an "adoring fantasy" and said rape can be performed without inflicting physical or emotional damage to the victim.

Decision
The decision of the Supreme Court was written by Peter Cory. He noted that until 1985, the Criminal Code outlawed any threat to kill or injure a person except threats spoken in front of a person. A major decision on that law was R v Nabis (1975), and the Parliament of Canada afterwards decided a better law was needed. The new law outlawed any kind of threat regarding bodily harm or killing. Cory found that bodily harm does not only mean killing.

As the law also referred to "serious bodily harm," Cory consulted The Shorter Oxford English Dictionary and found that "serious" meant "substantial", so "serious bodily harm" means substantial damage to the victim's health.  Cory concluded that this law would likely cover emotional damage, as the types of bodily harm covered by the law were not limited.  The Supreme Court also decided that the new law was meant to guard against threats that terrorize people, and that the law had a significant goal of upholding an individual's freedom.  R v LeBlanc (1989) was another case that found that terror was what was important and not whether the crime would actually occur.

Cory asserted that "Violence is inherent in the act of rape." He explained that in rape, sex and violence are intertwined, and that the rapist is exercising force which may have temporary physical effects but nevertheless potentially permanent emotional impact.  Cory said,

To back this up, Cory pointed to journal articles describing how victims often become depressed, cannot sleep, feel guilty or devalued, lose trust in people and become uninterested in sex. Thus, for the law not to recognize this would be a step backwards for sensitivity.

Aftermath
The McCraw case has been cited by the Supreme Court in later cases.  For example, in R v CD; R v CDK (2005), the Court noted that while the Youth Criminal Justice Act did not define "violent offence" and "serious bodily harm," McCraw indicated that these phrases referred to substantial damage to a victim's health.

References

External links
Full text of the decision

Supreme Court of Canada cases
1991 in Canadian case law
Rape in Canada
Canadian criminal case law